Herdla is a former municipality in the old Hordaland county in Norway. The municipality existed from 1871 until its dissolution in 1964. The administrative centre of the municipality was the small island-village of Herdla. The municipality included the northern third of the island of Holsnøy, the northern third of the island of Askøy, and the islands of Misje, Turøy, Toftøy, Rongøy, Blomøy, Ona, Bognøy, and many smaller surrounding islands.

History
On 1 January 1871, the western island district of the municipality of Manger was separated to form the new municipality of Herlø (an old spelling that was changed to Herdla in 1917).  Initially, the municipality had 2,484 residents.  During the 1960s, there were many municipal mergers across Norway due to the work of the Schei Committee. In January 1964, the municipality of Herdla was dissolved and its land was split up as follows:
the islands of Misje and Turøy (population: 404) became part of Fjell Municipality
the island of Herdla and all of Herdla on the island of Askøy (population: 1,564) became part of Askøy Municipality
all of Herdla on the island of Holsnøy (population: 811) became part of Meland Municipality
all of Herdla located west of the Hjeltefjorden (population: 2,131) became part of Øygarden Municipality
the island of Bognøy (population: 29) became part of Radøy Municipality

Herdla Church (Herdla kirke) dates back to 1863. The stone structure has 600 seats. The original church was demolished in the 19th century because it had too little space for the congregation.  During the Occupation of Norway by Nazi Germany,  the tower and the roofs were removed because of the belief that the British Royal Air Force used the church to navigate attacks on the west coast of Norway. The church was restored during 1910, 1935, and 1950.

Municipal council
The municipal council  of Herdla was made up of 13 representatives that were elected to four year terms.  The party breakdown of the final municipal council was as follows:

See also
List of former municipalities of Norway

References

External links

Former municipalities of Norway
1871 establishments in Norway
1964 disestablishments in Norway
Øygarden
Alver (municipality)
Askøy